Virginia Monier was an American stage actress and theatre manager. She was one of the first female theatre managers in the United States.

She was the founder-manager of the Miss Monier's Dramatic Saloon in New York City in 1838, and manager of the Washington Theatre in Washington, D.C. in 1840–1841, which made her a pioneer in a period when it was still very unusual for women to manage and found theatres in the USA.  She was also a successful actress in the 1840s, and the star attraction of the National Theatre (Washington) in 1836–41.

References

 Jane Kathleen Curry: Nineteenth-century American Women Theatre Managers

19th-century American actresses
American stage actresses
19th-century theatre managers
Women theatre managers and producers
19th-century American businesswomen
19th-century American businesspeople